"Down in Yon Forest" (or "Down in Yon Forrest"), also known as "All Bells in Paradise" and "Castleton Carol," is a traditional English Christmas carol dating to the Renaissance era, ultimately deriving from the anonymous Middle English poem known today as the Corpus Christi Carol. The song was originally associated with Good Friday or the Corpus Christi Feast rather than Christmas, but some more recent variants have additional verses which reference Christmas. It is listed in the Roud Folk Song Index as number 1523.

Multiple audio recordings have been made of the song, particularly in the town of Castleton, Derbyshire, England, where the famous composer and folk song collector Ralph Vaughan Williams encountered and transcribed a version sung by a Mr. J Hall in 1908. Like many English folk songs, it seems to have naturally made its way to the United States, where several traditional singers including Jean Ritchie have been recorded singing the song.

The carol has been arranged in modern English by Ralph Vaughan Williams, Nicholas Maw, John Jacob Niles and John Rutter, among others.  It has been recorded by artists including Joan Baez (on Noël), Martyn Bates with Max Eastley, Shirley Collins, The Albion Band, Bruce Cockburn (on Christmas), Kemper Crabb, Burl Ives (on Christmas Day in the Morning), John McCutcheon, Jean Ritchie (on Carols for All Seasons), Joglaresa (on In Hoary Winter's Night), Stick in the Wheel, Bob Rowe, Andreas Scholl, Steeleye Span (on Winter), Show of Hands (on Folk Music), Wovenhand (on Consider the Birds), Mark Lanegan, and the choir of Clare College, Cambridge.

Lyrics

See also
 List of Christmas carols

References

External links
 "Down in Yon Forest / Tien Arbaren" (Simple melody score with English and Esperanto lyrics.)

English folk songs
Christmas carols
Burl Ives songs